Stromanthe ramosissima is a species of plant in the Marantaceae family. It is endemic to Ecuador.  Its natural habitat is subtropical or tropical moist montane forests.

References

Flora of Ecuador
ramosissima
Vulnerable plants
Taxonomy articles created by Polbot